Lithophane laticinerea, the broad ashen pinion moth, is a species of cutworm or dart moth in the family Noctuidae. It is found in North America.

The MONA or Hodges number for Lithophane laticinerea is 9914.

References

Further reading

 
 
 

laticinerea
Articles created by Qbugbot
Moths described in 1874